Gilles de Paris (Aegidius Parisiensis, Giles of Paris) ( 1160 – 1223/1224) was a French poet of the twelfth century. He is best known for his instructional poem Carolinus, written for the future Louis VIII of France around 1200, when Louis was 13 years old.

External links
 Manuscript page

1160s births
1220s deaths
12th-century French poets
13th-century French poets
Medieval Latin poets
French poets
French male poets
13th-century Latin writers